Tangdhar is a village located in Kupwara district of the Indian union territory of Jammu and Kashmir. It is a forward village along the Line of Control (LoC). With Neelum valley to its north and Leepa to the south, Tangdhar is surrounded by Pakistan administered Kashmir from three sides. Tangdhar sector is popular for infiltrations and ceasefire violations from Pakistan.

Transport

Road
Tangdhar is well-connected by road with other places in Jammu and Kashmir and all over India. The Hajinaar Road and Kupwara-Trehgam Road connects the border village of Tangdhar to Kupwara.

Rail

Air
The nearest airport is Srinagar International Airport located at a distance of  respectively.

See also
Kupwara
Lolab Valley
Kupwara district
Tulail Valley
Teetwal

References

Villages in Kupwara district